The 2013 Shanghai Shenxin season is Shanghai Shenxin's 4th consecutive season in the Chinese Super League. They will also compete in the Chinese FA Cup starting in the third round.

Players

First team squad
As of 4 March 2013

Reserve squad

On loan

Transfers

In

Out

Loan in

Loan out

Competitions

Chinese Super League

Results summary

Results by round

Results

Chinese FA Cup

References

Shanghai Shenxin F.C. seasons
Shanghai Shenxin F.C.